Molly's Reach was a fictional restaurant in the real community of Gibson's Landing, British Columbia, during the nineteen years the Canadian television series The Beachcombers was set there. The building is now a real restaurant.

The show's fictional restaurant was named after the character who owned it, who served as a mother-figure for other characters. A reach is a geographical term for a section of a river. As the town cafe and natural meeting point, where Nick also rented a room as office space for his salvage company, much of the drama happened in and immediately around Molly's Reach.

The original structure was built in 1931, and served a variety of purposes, including a second hand store, a general store, a hardware store and a liquor store, prior to serving as a set for the television show.  After the show ended it was turned into an actual restaurant.

The Beachcombers was the Canadian Broadcasting Corporation's longest running series, one which was re-sold in fifty foreign markets, and fans of the show, both foreign and domestic, seek out the restaurant. The restaurant's walls bear many photos featuring the show's cast and crew. In 2016 the Vancouver Sun called the restaurant Gibsons' "most prominent landmark". It is located in the middle of town on the main highway, just up the street from the government dock.

A made-for-TV movie, The New Beachcombers, to mark the thirtieth anniversary of the original series first episode, revolved around a fictional fight to prevent the restaurant being torn down and replaced by condominiums.

The building was put up for sale on September 22, 2019.

References

Restaurants in British Columbia